Bell Park is a residential suburb of Geelong, Victoria, Australia.  It is located 3 km north-west of the Geelong city centre and is bordered to the north by Cowies Creek, to the east by Thompson Road, to the south by the Midland Highway and to the west by Anakie Road.

At the 2016 Census, Bell Park had a population of 5,009.

History 
Bell Park was named after the Bell Park homestead built by an early settler named John Bell. Part of Bell's homestead is preserved at the Grace McKellar Centre.

In the early 1950s, residential development of the area increased with migrants and refugees arriving from Europe after World War II. The Post Office opened on 1 July 1953. There are two Ukrainian churches in Bell Park—one Orthodox and one Catholic.

Facilities
As of 2022, there are three shopping strips in Bell Park.

The strip along Milton Street has a news agent, hairdresser, day spa, bottle shop, Dnister Ukrainian Credit Co-operative, post office, hardware store, butcher, barber, bakery and small supermarket.

The strip on Hughes Street has a greengrocer, barber, butcher, cafe/bakery, supermarket and pharmacy

The strip along Separation Street has two hairdressers, gym, day spa, news agent, butcher, two cake stores, supermarket, real estate agent, milk bar, chiropractor, Thai take-away, fish and chips store, pizza store, Croatian restaurant/club, Asian grocery store, bank, stationer, bottle store, pharmacy, doctor clinic, cafe, Chinese take-away, chicken and chips take-away.

Sport 
The Bell Park Football Club are an Australian Rules football team competing in the Geelong Football League.

Hume reserve has three soccer pitches and is home to the Corio Soccer Club.

Education 
Bell Park is home to:

 North Geelong Secondary College
 Nelson Park School
 Bell Park North Primary School
 Holy Family Catholic Primary School.

Heritage listed sites 
45 Ballarat Road Bell Park

References

External links 

 Australian Places - Bell Park
 Bell Park - City of Greater Geelong

Suburbs of Geelong